Dichomeris pelocnista is a moth in the family Gelechiidae. It was described by Edward Meyrick in 1939. It is found on Java in Indonesia.

References

Moths described in 1939
pelocnista